6-deoxy-5-ketofructose 1-phosphate synthase (DKFP synthase, MJ1585 (gene)) is an enzyme with systematic name 2-oxopropanal:D-fructose 1,6-bisphosphate glycerone-phosphotransferase. This enzyme catalyses the following chemical reaction

(1) methylglyoxal + D-fructose 1,6-bisphosphate  D-glyceraldehyde 3-phosphate + 1-deoxy-D-threo-hexo-2,5-diulose 6-phosphate
(2) methylglyoxal + D-fructose 1-phosphate  D-glyceraldehyde + 1-deoxy-D-threo-hexo-2,5-diulose 6-phosphate

This enzyme plays a key role in an alternative pathway of the biosynthesis of 3-dehydroquinate.

References

External links 
 

EC 2.2.1